
Turek County is a unit of territorial administration and local government (powiat) in Greater Poland Voivodeship, west-central Poland. It came into being on 1 January 1999 as a result of the Polish local government reforms passed in 1998.

As of 2006 its total population is 83,635, out of which the population of Turek is 29,302, that of Tuliszków is 3,393, that of Dobra is 1,511, and the rural population is 49,429.

Neighbouring counties
Turek County is bordered by Koło County to the north, Poddębice County to the east, Sieradz County to the south, Kalisz County to the south-west and Konin County to the north-west.

Administrative division
The county is subdivided into nine gminas (one urban, two urban-rural and six rural). These are listed in the following table, in descending order of population.

References
Polish official population figures 2006

 
Turek